This is a list of Statutory rules made in the Northern Ireland in the year 2023.

1-100

See also

List of Acts of the Northern Ireland Assembly from 2023
List of Acts of the Parliament of the United Kingdom from 2023

References

Law of Northern Ireland
Law of the United Kingdom
2023
2023 in British politics
Northern Ireland
Northern Ireland law-related lists